Kaiti Constituency is an electoral constituency in Kenya. It is one of six constituencies in Makueni County. The constituency was established for the 1997 elections.

Members of Parliament

Locations and wards

References

External links 
Map of the constituency
Website

Constituencies in Makueni County
Constituencies in Eastern Province (Kenya)
1997 establishments in Kenya
Constituencies established in 1997